Félix de Roy (25 July 1883 – 15 May 1942) was a Belgian astronomer, born in Antwerp. He observed and recorded more than 5,000 variable stars during his career. He was a member of the British Astronomical Association and directed its Variable Star Section between 1922 and 1939. He also occasionally observed meteors for the British Astronomical Association.

References

1883 births
1942 deaths
Scientists from Antwerp
20th-century Belgian astronomers